Al Bandari bint Abdulaziz Al Saud (1928 – 8 May 2008) was a daughter of King Abdulaziz of Saudi Arabia.

Early life
Al Bandari was born in 1928. She was the daughter of King Abdulaziz and Jawhara bint Sa'ad bin Abdul Muhsin Al Sudairi. Her mother had been married to Sa'ad bin Abdul Rahman, the brother of King Abdulaziz. After Sa'ad's death in the battle of Kanzan in 1915, she married Abdulaziz and they had four children, Al Bandari, Saad, Abdul Muhsin and Musa'id.

Personal life
Al Bandari was married to Bandar bin Muhammad bin Abdul Rahman Al Saud, the owner designate of the Rupali Bank. One of their daughters, Noura, was the spouse of Mohammed bin Abdullah bin Faisal.

In August 1984 Al Bandari had a skin surgery in New York City which was performed by dermatologist Joseph Eller.

Death
Al Bandari died on 8 May 2008 at the age of 80 at the King Faisal Specialist Hospital in Riyadh. Her funeral was held at the city's Imam Turki bin Abdullah Mosque. Messages of condolences were sent from throughout the Middle East to King Abdullah and the Saudi royal family. Condolences came from Sabah Al-Ahmad Al-Jaber Al-Sabah, the Emir of Kuwait, Sultan Qaboos of Oman, King Hamad of Bahrain, Emir Hamad bin Khalifa of Qatar and his son Sheikh Tamim bin Hamad.

Ancestry

References

Al Bandari
Al Bandari
1928 births
2008 deaths
Al Bandari